The 2015 Budweiser Duels were a pair of NASCAR Sprint Cup Series stock car races that were held on February 19, 2015, at Daytona International Speedway in Daytona Beach, Florida. Both contested over 60 laps, they were the qualifying races for the 2015 Daytona 500. Hendrick Motorsports swept both races, with Dale Earnhardt Jr. winning the first Duel and Jimmie Johnson winning the second Duel.

Report

Background

Daytona International Speedway is one of six superspeedways to hold NASCAR races, the others being Michigan International Speedway, Auto Club Speedway, Indianapolis Motor Speedway, Pocono Raceway and Talladega Superspeedway. The track's turns are banked at 31 degrees, while the front stretch, the location of the finish line, is banked at 18 degrees.

Practice

First practice (February 14)

Second practice (February 14)
Ryan Newman was forced to change engines after blowing one half an hour into the session. He will have to start from the rear in one of the Duel races. Martin Truex Jr. also dealt with engine gremlins due to a crack in his car's oil pan, but did not change engines.

Pole qualifying

The pole qualifying took place at 1:00 p.m. Eastern time on Sunday, February 15, a week prior to the Daytona 500 race itself. For the first time in the history of the Daytona 500, NASCAR eliminated the traditional single car qualifying format for the pole qualifying and introduced the Formula One-style knockout qualifying format, first introduced in the 2014 season. Unlike the other tracks however, the pole qualifying consists of three sessions of five minutes each, first introduced in the fall Talladega race:
NASCAR randomly split the field into two groups for session 1 (one group had 25 cars, the other had 24). Each group had its own five minutes of track time. The fastest 24 cars overall from either group will advance to session 2.
After a ten-minute break, these 24 cars would get five minutes of track time for session 2. The qualifying times from session 1 would reset prior to the start of session 2. The fastest 12 cars in session 2 will advance to session 3.
Following a seven-minute break, these 12 cars would then compete for the top two guaranteed spots in the final five-minute session. Again, the qualifying times from session 2 would reset prior to the start of session 3.
The top two times in the final qualifying session will be locked in the front row of the Daytona 500 starting grid, while the other 41 starting spots would be determined by the two Budweiser Duels the following Thursday.

Gordon felt that in the new qualifying format, "the driver finally gets to play a role". He also stated that he had "a fast race car" and that the pole position was "one of the most gratifying poles I've had, not just because it's my final Daytona". His teammate Jimmie Johnson will start right alongside in 2nd. In the first round of qualifying, Clint Bowyer tried to go under Reed Sorenson when he got hit in the rear by Carl Edwards and turned right into Sorenson. Both cars slammed the wall and collected Bobby Labonte and J. J. Yeley. Denny Hamlin may have taken some damage. The session was red flagged with a minute and 22 seconds left. After the red flag was lifted, no one was able to make it back to the line before time expired. Upon exiting his car, Bowyer vented his frustrations at the Daytona qualifying procedure.

The cars of Dale Earnhardt Jr. and Denny Hamlin failed post-qualifying inspection and will start from the rear of the field in their respective Duel races. Earnhardt's car was found to be too low on the left front, while the track bar on Hamlin's car was found to be  beyond the maximum allowed. Both drivers expressed thoughts on Twitter post-penalties, with both looking forward to moving up the order in the Duels.

Qualifying results

Practice (post-qualifying)

Third practice (February 18)
During this session, there was a four car wreck on the backstretch that involved Michael Annett, Jeb Burton, Denny Hamlin and Danica Patrick. It started when Hamlin pulled out of line and Patrick tried to follow him, but made contact with the right-front corner of Hamlin's car when she over-corrected and hit the wall. Michael Annett tried to go high around Patrick on the outside when he got turned by Jeb Burton. Patrick, Annett and Burton all switched to backup cars. After the incident, Patrick stated that her car "sort of just started turning toward the right, the back end was coming around and it swapped ends" and that Hamlin was trying to "make a third lane in the middle and it felt like it must have caught my bumper". Hamlin felt that Patrick had intended to block his path, stating that a driver has "to give a little bit of extra room in practice" and that if he "had to guess, she probably saw in her mirror that I was going down there and tried to stay in front of me".

Fourth practice (February 18)

Final practice (February 19)
This session had only five drivers take part in it doing single car runs.

Races

Race One

First-half

Start
The first race started at 7:19 p.m. Eastern time when Jeff Gordon led the field to the green. Matt Kenseth took the lead with the bottom lane to lead lap one. The first caution of the race flew on lap 17 after Casey Mears blew an engine in turn 1. Kenseth and Gordon swapped the lead on pit road, and Gordon exited as the leader for the restart on lap 24. Michael Annett was forced to drop to the end of the longest line because his crew was over the wall too soon.

Trouble in the tri-oval
Kenseth used the bottom line and jumped in front of Gordon to take back the lead on lap 26, just ahead of the race's second caution when Johnny Sauter crashed in the tri-oval, following contact with A. J. Allmendinger, while Aric Almirola also picked up some damage to his car.

Sauter stated that he was "just riding along" and that he was "trying to mind my business" before the contact with Allmendinger, with the point of impact being "in the left rear quarter panel". He also stated that it was "a bummer deal" for himself and his BK Racing team. Sauter and Allmendinger did however, make the starting lineup for the race, on their qualifying speeds. Allmendinger apologised for the contact with Sauter, while stating that his JTG Daugherty Racing car was fast, while also criticizing the racing that was occurring, stating that he "was trying to stay out of trouble and got put in the middle and I was trying to bail out of the middle". Michael McDowell dropped to the end of the longest line, for the restart on lap 33, after his crew was over the wall too soon.

Second-half
Dale Earnhardt Jr. used a slight push from the bottom line to take the lead on lap 35. Kenseth took the lead back from Earnhardt on the bottom to take back the lead on lap 39. On lap 43, Earnhardt used a slingshot move to overtake Kenseth for good. The third caution of the race flew on lap 51 when Trevor Bayne got loose, came down on Kyle Larson and hit the wall in turn 1. During this period, Ty Dillon broke his gear shifter. The race restarted with five laps to go and Earnhardt Jr. held off Jeff Gordon to win race one. Earnhardt praised the work of his spotter TJ Majors in victory lane, stating that he "gave me the information I needed to make the moves I needed" and that he was "looking forward to getting to Sunday and trying to get another Daytona 500 win". Dillon, finished 16th after the gearshift issues, and was able to make the field. He described the result as "hard to explain" and that he had "been coming here since I was a kid watching my grandfather's cars race". Ron Hornaday Jr. and Justin Marks failed to make the race.

Results

Race 2

First-half

Start
Before the start, Josh Wise stalled at the entrance of pit road and took his car to the garage. This ultimately eliminated him from racing in the Daytona 500. The second race started 18 minutes late at 9:19 p.m. with Jimmie Johnson leading the field to the green flag. Kyle Busch took the lead on lap one. The first caution of the race flew on lap 19 for a spin by David Ragan, exiting turn 4. Ragan had cut across the nose of Justin Allgaier and got turned down onto the apron, making contact with the inside wall. Kyle Busch was first off pit road, but he was caught speeding on pit road and was forced to drop to the end of the line, allowing Johnson to retake the lead for the restart, on lap 25. Allgaier was also sent to the rear, as his pit crew came across the wall too soon.

Second-half
The second caution of the race flew on lap 37 for a multi-car wreck in the tri-oval. It started exiting turn 4 when Jeb Burton turned down into Sam Hornish Jr. who turned into Alex Bowman. Austin Dillon destroyed his splitter driving through the grass trying to avoid the wreck, which caused the race to be red flagged for five minutes. Neither Bowman nor Burton qualified for the Daytona 500. The race restarted with 20 laps to go. With 14 laps to go, Kurt Busch was given a drive-through penalty for passing below the double yellow line. The third caution of the race flew with three laps to go for a four car wreck in turn 3. Denny Hamlin gave Danica Patrick a push which turned her around and collected Brian Scott and Bobby Labonte. Scott failed to qualify for the Daytona 500 as a result, while Labonte relied upon a past champion's provisional to get into the race.

Finish
In a green–white–checker finish, Johnson held off a last lap charge by Kyle Busch and Carl Edwards to win the race. Johnson defined the Speedweeks at Daytona as "awesome" for his Hendrick Motorsports team, sweeping the Duels and the front row for the Daytona 500. Johnson also called his car as "mad fast". Patrick confronted Hamlin on pit road after the race. After the confrontation, Patrick told reporters that she had "no explanation for that", while also stating Hamlin was in the wrong by believing "that he's taking the air and getting it off the spoiler, and he's not squared up either".

Results

Media

Television

Radio

Notes

References

Budweiser Duels
Budweiser Duels
NASCAR races at Daytona International Speedway